John Claud Segraves Jr. (May 21, 1911 – May 3, 1956) was an American Negro league outfielder .

A native of Bowling Green, Kentucky, Segraves was the older brother of fellow-Negro leaguer Sam Segraves. He played for the Indianapolis Athletics in 1937. Segraves died in Indianapolis, Indiana in 1956 at age 44.

References

External links
 and Seamheads

1911 births
1956 deaths
Indianapolis Athletics players
20th-century African-American sportspeople
Baseball outfielders